The 1953 Cork Intermediate Hurling Championship was the 44th staging of the Cork Intermediate Hurling Championship since its establishment by the Cork County Board in 1909.

Newtownshandrum won the championship following a 0-05 to 0-04 defeat of Glen Rovers in the final. This was their first ever championship title in the grade.

References

Cork Intermediate Hurling Championship
Cork Intermediate Hurling Championship